David V. Connelly (September 14, 1898 – August 27, 1955) was an American baseball and basketball coach and college athletics administrator.  He was affiliated with the University of Toledo as a coach and athletic director for approximately 30 years.

Early years
Connelly was born in Easthampton, Massachusetts, in 1898. He served in the United States Army Tank Corps during World War I.  After being discharged from the Army, he played professional basketball in the New York State Basketball League. He also played professional baseball as a shortstop in the Detroit Tigers farm system with a team in Jackson, Michigan. After sustaining an injury in 1924, he enrolled at Michigan State Normal College where he received a degree in physical education.

University of Toledo
In 1926, Connelly was hired as the men's basketball coach at the University of Toledo.  He served as the school's men's basketball coach for eight years from 1926 to 1934, compiling a 48–78 record.  In 1928, he was also appointed as the school's athletic director, a position he held from 1928 to 1934 and again from 1942 to 1949.  He also served as the head baseball coach at the University of Toledo from 1932 to 1950, compiling a 114–93 record. Connelly remained at the University of Toledo for nearly 30 years, and his other positions included track and cross country coach for six years, football coach for three years, and boxing coach for one year. From 1949 until 1955, he served as a professor of physical education and head of the department of physical education. He also wrote the University of Toledo's fight song, "U of Toledo", in 1932.  Connelly also served as the City of Toledo's recreation supervisor during the summers from 1932 to 1937.

Family and death
Connelly and his wife, Mary McHugh Connelly, had two sons and a daughter. Connelly died in 1955 at age 56.

References

External links
 

1898 births
1955 deaths
Toledo Rockets athletic directors
Toledo Rockets baseball coaches
Toledo Rockets football coaches
Toledo Rockets men's basketball coaches
Toledo Rockets boxing coaches
Toledo Rockets track and field coaches
United States Army personnel of World War I
Basketball coaches from Massachusetts
Eastern Michigan University alumni
People from Easthampton, Massachusetts
Toledo Rockets cross country coaches